The Duck Factory is an American sitcom produced by MTM Enterprises that aired on NBC from April 12 until July 11, 1984. It was Jim Carrey's first lead role in a Hollywood production. It was also the only time when Don Messick appeared in live-action, although he also voiced a cartoon character in the sitcom as well. The show was set at a small independent animation studio, and was co-created by Allan Burns and Herbert Klynn. It won two Emmy Awards.

Background
Burns had started his career as a writer/animator for The Rocky and Bullwinkle Show and George of the Jungle, before turning to live action and co-creating The Mary Tyler Moore Show; Klynn had worked in various production capacities on Mr. Magoo and Gerald McBoing-Boing, amongst many other cartoons.

Overview
The premiere episode introduces Skip Tarkenton (Carrey), a somewhat naive and optimistic young man who has come to Hollywood looking for a job as a cartoonist.  When he arrives at a low-budget animation company called Buddy Winkler Productions, he finds out Buddy Winkler has just died, and the company desperately needs new blood. So Skip gets an animation job at the firm, which is nicknamed "The Duck Factory" as their main cartoon is "The Dippy Duck Show".

Other Duck Factory employees seen regularly on the show were man-of-a-thousand-cartoon voices Wally Wooster (played by real-life cartoon voice artist Don Messick); cynical, sometimes lazy comedy writer Marty Fenneman (played by real-life comedy writer Jay Tarses); veteran artist and animator Brooks Carmichael (Jack Gilford); younger storyboard artist Roland Culp (Clarence Gilyard); sarcastic editor Andrea Lewin; and hard-nosed, penny-pinching business manager Aggie Aylesworth.  Buddy Winkler Productions was now owned by Buddy's young, ditzy but good-hearted widow, Mrs. Sheree Winkler (Teresa Ganzel), a former topless ice dancer who had been married to Buddy for all of three weeks before his death.

Production
Seen in some episodes were clips from various "Dippy Duck" shows the Buddy Winkler crew were working on—sometimes fully animated, sometimes in pencil sketch or animatic form.  The opening and closing credits were also animated.  Series co-creator Klynn was also credited as the show's "creative animation consultant", while production of the actual animated material was done by Ted and Gerry Woolery for which each won an Emmy.

Show history
The Duck Factory lasted thirteen episodes; it premiered April 12, 1984. It was directed primarily by Gene Reynolds, Rod Daniel, and Victor Lobel, who each did three episodes. The show initially aired at 9:30 on Thursday nights, directly after Cheers (at the time, not yet a top ten hit; Cheers finished the 1983/84 television season in 34th place).  The show replaced Buffalo Bill on NBC's schedule.  Jay Tarses, an actor on The Duck Factory, had been the co-creator and executive producer of Buffalo Bill, which had its final network telecast on Thursday, April 5, 1984.

Episodes of The Duck Factory were shown out of the producers' intended order by NBC, leading to significant continuity problems with the series.  Most notably, the eighth episode (in which Skip is promoted to being the producer of "The Dippy Duck Show", much to the resentment of the show's staff) was shown as episode 2.  As broadcast, succeeding episodes ping-ponged between Skip being the show's producer, and Skip being the show's low-ranking apprentice animator, with no explanation as to the reason for the constant change of status.  As well, what the producers had intended to air as the second episode (and which set up the continuing premise of the series) was shown as the thirteenth; Mrs. Winkler was the receptionist in second episode as broadcast, but then in the fourth episode she becomes the receptionist, etc.

The show changed timeslots in June, moving to Wednesdays at 9:30.  The last original episode of The Duck Factory was broadcast on July 11, 1984.

Cast
 Jim Carrey as Skip Tarkenton
 Jack Gilford as Brooks Carmichael
Nancy Lane as Andrea Lewin
 Jay Tarses as Marty Fenneman
 Don Messick as Wally Wooster
 Messick also voiced Dippy Duck
 Julie Payne as Aggie Aylesworth
 Clarence Gilyard Jr as Roland Culp
 Teresa Ganzel as Mrs. Sheree Winkler

Episodes

US television ratings

Home media
In 1995, at the height of Carrey's career, two VHS videocassettes were released in the United States by MTM Home Video, one containing the first three episodes, the other the last three episodes. The two volumes were released in the United Kingdom in 1997 (Pictured above), slightly expanded to the first four and the last four episodes of the series (which had never been broadcast in the UK).

References

External links
 
 First episode posted by The Museum of Classic Chicago Television on YouTube
 All episodes on Internet Archive

NBC original programming
1984 American television series debuts
1984 American television series endings
1980s American sitcoms
1980s American workplace comedy television series
American television series with live action and animation
Animated television series about ducks
Television series about television
Television series by MTM Enterprises
Television shows set in Los Angeles